Tropical Storm Son-Tinh, known in the Philippines as Tropical Storm Henry, was a weak but very deadly tropical cyclone that devastated Vietnam and Laos in July 2018. Son-Tinh originated from an area of low pressure over the Philippine Sea on July 15, 2018. Moving quickly westwards, Son-Tinh strengthened to the ninth tropical storm of the annual typhoon season on July 17. Intensifying only slightly while crossing the South China Sea, Son-Tinh made its first landfall over Hainan Island on July 18. After emerging into the Gulf of Tonkin, Son-Tinh restrengthened before making its second landfall as a tropical storm in Northern Vietnam on July 19. Once inland, Son-Tinh weakened into a low pressure area as it slowed and made a clockwise loop. The remnants of Son-Tinh then emerged back over water and regenerated into a tropical depression late on July 21.

The storm caused severe floods and mudslides in Vietnam, leading to the death of at least 32 people. Over  of agricultural land was inundated and at least 17,000 farm animals were swept away by the floods. The storm also caused or related to the havoc in the neighbouring country of Laos with the collapse of Attapeu dam, in which 40 people died and 98 more missing (and probably as much as 1,100 more people are missing) and 6,600 more are displaced.

Meteorological history 

An area of low pressure strengthened into a tropical depression on July 15, to the northwest of Manila, Philippines. Accordingly, the Joint Typhoon Warning Center (JTWC) designated it as 11W while the Philippine Atmospheric, Geophysical and Astronomical Services Administration (PAGASA) gave it the local name Henry. As the system moved westward at high speed, it gradually intensified as its convective structure improved, and strengthened a tropical storm by July 17, with the Japan Meteorological Agency (JMA) assigning the system the international name Son-Tinh.

Thereafter, however, Son-Tinh weakened slightly as it neared Hainan island due to moderate vertical wind shear. Continuing to struggle to maintain intensity amid increasing wind shear, Son-Tinh crossed over Hainan island at around 03:00 UTC on July 18; despite land interaction the system continued to maintain its overall convective organization. Later that day, as Son-Tinh emerged from land into the Gulf of Tonkin, Son-Tinh managed to intensify over the warm waters, with sea surface temperatures of over  contributing to offset otherwise unfavorable upper atmospheric conditions. Once inland over Northern Vietnam, Son-Tinh began to weaken quickly. Both the JMA and the JTWC issued their final warnings on Son-Tinh on July 19 as the system degenerated into an area of low pressure embedded in the monsoon. The JTWC, however, continued to track Son-Tinh's remnants for the next two days.

Through July 19 and 20, Son-Tinh's remnants curved northwards and then eastwards over Northern Vietnam, before moving southeastward back into the Gulf of Tonkin on July 21. Persistent convection developed over the system, aided by a tropical upper tropospheric trough to the northeast, prompting the JTWC to begin issuing advisories on Son-Tinh once again on July 21. Simultaneously the JMA reported that Son-Tinh had regenerated into a tropical depression. With vertical wind shear now low and sea surface temperatures remaining high near , the JTWC stated that Son-Tinh intensified back into a tropical storm on July 22, while the JMA continued to maintain Son-Tinh as a tropical depression.

Preparations and impact

China 
Total economic loss nationwide were at ¥240 million (US$35.7 million).

Vietnam 

On July 18, the Vietnamese government ordered all vessels to return to port.

In Vietnam, the Thanh Hóa and Nghệ An provinces suffered the most damage, especially with the wake of the storm continuing to generate significant rainfall. It caused major flooding in Northern Vietnam and the capital city of Hanoi. 35 people were killed, more than 5,000 houses,  of crops, and 17,000 farm animals were either swept away, submerged, or otherwise destroyed. The storm has cut off access to several areas in the country and flood water covers several streets in the capital city. Economic losses were estimated to be ₫6.615 trillion (US$287 million).

Laos 

On July 23, a hydroelectric dam under construction in Attapeu Province, south-east Laos, collapsed. As of September 25, 40 people were confirmed dead, at least 98 more were missing (and probably as much as 1,100 more people are missing) and 6,600 others were displaced.

See also 

Weather of 2018
Tropical cyclones in 2018
 Typhoon Nina (1975) – devastating tropical cyclone in which most of the effects are located in the collapse of a dam
 Tropical Storm Amy (1994)
 Tropical Storm Linda (1997) – similarly deadly tropical cyclone to the south where Son-Tinh hit.
 Tropical Storm Soudelor (2009)
 2011 Southeast Asian floods
 Typhoon Son-Tinh – storm with the same name that impacted the same area in 2012.
 Tropical Storm Aere (2016)
 Tropical Storm Sonca (2017) – another cyclone with similar track and floods, especially affecting Northeast Thailand (Sakon Nakhon Province).
 October 2017 Vietnam tropical depression – another deadly cyclone with similar landfalling point and floods, this time affecting the Central Vietnam.
 Tropical Storm Bebinca (2018) - another storm that made landfall at the same area.
 Tropical Storm Kompasu (2021)

References 

2018 disasters in Vietnam
2018 Pacific typhoon season
July 2018 events in Asia
Typhoons in Vietnam
Western Pacific tropical storms
2018 disasters in China
Typhoons in China
2018 disasters in the Philippines
Typhoons in the Philippines
Son-Tinh